Pickerington Ponds Metro Park is a metropolitan park in Pickerington and Columbus, Ohio, owned and operated by Columbus and Franklin County Metro Parks. The park has  with several trails and five overlooks for bird and other wildlife watching. It is a State Nature Preserve, primarily focused on providing a habitat for various birds and contains many wetland areas. Pickerington Ponds is designated an Important Bird Area by Audubon Ohio. More than 260 species of birds have been seen here.

The wetlands have been an attraction for local birdwatchers since the 1930s, or potentially earlier. It was slowly purchased by environmentalists beginning in 1974, and the first 153 acres were turned over to the metro parks system around 1979.

References

External links

 

Parks in Ohio
Protected areas of Fairfield County, Ohio
Protected areas of Franklin County, Ohio
Important Bird Areas of the United States